Over the Line Fence is a Canadian agricultural documentary television series which aired on CBC Television in 1956.

Premise
This series featured aspects of agricultural and rural life. Episodes included relevant documentary films. It was produced by Murray Creed of CBC's Farm Department. He later produced Country Calendar (now Country Canada) and Marketplace.

Scheduling
This half-hour series was broadcast Saturdays at 5:00 p.m. from 30 June to 22 September 1956.

The debut episode on 30 June 1956 featured the 1953 NFB documentary film "The World at Your Feet"  about soil and plant growth.

Other episodes concerned fishing, Scottish sheep ranching and Western Canadian wheat production (7 July).

References

External links
 

CBC Television original programming
1956 Canadian television series debuts
1956 Canadian television series endings
1950s Canadian documentary television series
Black-and-white Canadian television shows